Carla Aparecida Perez Soares da Silva (née Soares; born November 16, 1977) is a Brazilian singer, dancer, television presenter and former actress. She reached fame in the mid-1990s after performing as the blonde dancer with axé group É o Tchan! (loira do Tchan).

Biography
Carla Perez was born in Salvador, Bahia on November 16, 1977, to Carlos Soares and Ivone Perez; on her mother's side, she is of Spanish descent. She also has two brothers and two sisters. When she was 15 years old, she gave up on her baile de debutante to afford a model course. In 1995 she was invited to perform for newly founded axé group É o Tchan!, what launched her into nationwide fame and later on led her to pose naked five times for Playboy Brasil. Perez parted ways with É o Tchan! in 1998 to pursue personal projects, such as the one of being an actress; in the same year she starred alongside Alexandre Pires (her boyfriend at the time), Perry Salles, Lázaro Ramos and Lucci Ferreira in the semi-fictionalized biopic Cinderela Baiana, directed by Conrado Sanchez. It was a critical and commercial failure, and Perez announced many years after the film's release that she had disowned it. Her final acting role was a cameo in the 1999 film Xuxa Requebra. Around the same time she hosted the variety shows Fantasia (from 1998 to 1999) and Canta e Dança, Minha Gente (from 1999 to 2001), both broadcast by SBT.

Beginning in 2000, when she released her first album, Algodão-Doce, through Cinema Music, and founded the Carnival block of the same name, Perez began to dedicate herself for children. She released two further albums, Todos Iguais and Eletro Kids, in 2005 and 2007 respectively. From 2003 to 2008 she covered the Bahian Carnaval for Rede Bandeirantes. More recently, from 2012 to 2017, she hosted the children's show Clube da Alegria, broadcast by TV Aratu in Bahia.

Personal life
Perez had a short-lived relationship with Só Pra Contrariar frontman Alexandre Pires in the late 1990s. In 2000 she met Harmonia do Samba vocalist Manuel Alexandre Oliveira da Silva (better known as Xanddy), and they married the following year. The couple has two children: Camilly Victória (born 2001) and Victor Alexandre (born 2003). From early 2016 until late 2017 they lived in Orlando, Florida.

Perez is an Evangelical Christian.

Filmography

Television

Film

Discography

References

External links
 
 
 
 

1977 births
Living people
Brazilian female dancers
Brazilian film actresses
20th-century Brazilian actresses
20th-century Brazilian women singers
20th-century Brazilian singers
21st-century Brazilian women singers
21st-century Brazilian singers
Brazilian people of Spanish descent
Brazilian evangelicals
People from Salvador, Bahia
Brazilian women television presenters